Mamantšo is a community council located in the Mafeteng District of Lesotho. Its population in 2006 was 21,175.

Villages
The community of 'Mamantšo includes 80 different villages according to the Lesotho Bureau of Statistics, they are listed below:
 Ha 'Mikia
 Ha Bele (Motsekuoa)
 Ha Challa
 Ha Cheche
 Ha Damane
 Ha Hlaheng
 Ha Khapetsi
 Ha Khausi
 Ha Khirisone
 Ha Khoele
 Ha Khola
 Ha Lejelathoko (Kolo)
 Ha Lekeba
 Ha Mahlasane
 Ha Mahlehle
 Ha Maholi
 Ha Majake
 Ha Makintane
 Ha Matlali
 Ha Mochekoane
 Ha Moeketsane
 Ha Mofo
 Ha Mohale (Kolo)
 Ha Mohlalefi
 Ha Moiphepi
 Ha Molise
 Ha Molokoe
 Ha Monkhe
 Ha Motlokoa
 Ha Motumi
 Ha Mpalami
 Ha Mphamo
 Ha Mphaololi
 Ha Mphasa
 Ha Mpopo
 Ha Nkhabu
 Ha Nkhabu (Kolo)
 Ha Nooana
 Ha Notši
 Ha Ntisana
 Ha Ntsie
 Ha Petlane
 Ha Petlane (Kolo)
 Ha Phakoe
 Ha Rabeleng
 Ha Rabu
 Ha Ralenkoane
 Ha Raliopelo
 Ha Ralitabo
 Ha Ramothabeng
 Ha Rampenyane
 Ha Rankhethi
 Ha Ranteme
 Ha Raputsoe
 Ha Ratšoeu
 Ha Rou
 Ha Sekoai
 Ha Semoli
 Ha Seobi
 Ha Taemane
 Ha Tan
 Ha Tlai-Tlai
 Ha Tlaliatsana
 Ha Tokonye
 Ha Tomotomo
 Khubetsoana
 Koi-Boot
 Malaleng
 Malimong
 Mankoaneng
 Manyareleng
 Marakong
 Marutlhoaneng
 Matsoseng
 Motsekuoa
 Pontšeng
 Reisi
 Sephokoaneng
 Tebang
 Tibeleng.

References

External links
 Google map of community villages

Populated places in Mafeteng District